Christian Mayer (born 10 January 1972 in Villach) is an Austrian former alpine skier. He won the Alpine Ski World Cup Giant Slalom title in 1993/94 (and two bronze-medals in Winter Olympic Games and one bronze-medal in FIS Alpine Skiing World Championships).

World cup victories

External links
 
 

1972 births
Living people
Austrian male alpine skiers
Olympic alpine skiers of Austria
Olympic bronze medalists for Austria
Alpine skiers at the 1992 Winter Olympics
Alpine skiers at the 1994 Winter Olympics
Alpine skiers at the 1998 Winter Olympics
Olympic medalists in alpine skiing
FIS Alpine Ski World Cup champions
Medalists at the 1998 Winter Olympics
Medalists at the 1994 Winter Olympics
20th-century Austrian people
21st-century Austrian people